The King's Birthday Honours 1901 were announced 9 November 1901, the birthday of the new monarch Edward VII. The list included appointments to various orders and honours of the United Kingdom and British India.

The list was published in The Times 9 November 1901, and the various honours were gazetted in The London Gazette 9 November 1901, 12 November 1901, and 15 November 1901.

The recipients of honours are displayed or referred to as they were styled before their new honour and arranged by honour and where appropriate by rank (Knight Grand Cross, Knight Commander etc.) then division (Military, Civil).

Privy Council
 The Duke of Buccleuch, KG, KT
 Sir Henry Fletcher, Baronet, CB, Member of Parliament (MP)
 Sir John Winfield Bonser, Chief Justice of the Supreme Court, Ceylon

Baronet
 Alderman Frank Green, the Right Honourable the Lord Mayor of London

Knight Bachelor
 George Bullough, Esq.
 George Anderson Critchett, Esq., FRCS
 George Hussey, Esq., Mayor of Southampton
 Ernest Spencer, Esq., MP
 George Gough Arbuthnot, Esq., of Madras
 Samuel Brownlow Gray, Esq., Chief Justice of Bermuda
 Archibald Campbell Lawrie, Esq., on retirement as Senior Puisne Justice of the Supreme Court, Ceylon
 Joseph Ignatius Little, Esq., Chief Justice, Newfoundland

The Most Honourable Order of the Bath

Knight Grand Cross of the Order of the Bath (GCB) 
 Civil Division
 Sir Francis Richard Plunkett, GCMG, His Majesty's Ambassador at Vienna

Knights Commander of the Order of the Bath (KCB) 
 Civil Division
 Sir Montagu Ommanney, KCMG, Under Secretary of State for the Colonies
 Robert Anderson, Esq, CB, LLD, late Assistant Commissioner of Police
 Francis Hopwood, Esq., CB, CMG, Permanent Secretary, Board of Trade
 Samuel Butler Provis, Esq., CB, Permanent Secretary, Local Government Board
 George Lisle Ryder, Esq., CB, Chairman of the Board of Customs
 Military Division
 Admiral George Digby Morant
 Vice-Admiral Charles George Fane
 Colonel Thales Pease, CB

Companions of the Order of the Bath (CB) 
Civil division
 Clinton Edward Dawkins, Esq.
 Major-General Constantine Phipps Carey, RE, Chief Engineer, Local Government Board
 Colonel Moreton John Wheatley, RE, Bailiff of the Royal Parks
 David Parry Williams, Esq., Collector of Customs, Liverpool

Order of the Star of India

Knight Commander of the Order of the Star of India (KCSI) 
 James John Digges La Touche, Esq., CSI, Indian Civil Service
 Raja Surindar Bikram Prakash Bahadur, of Sirmur
 Sultan Ahmed bin Fadthl, of Lahej

Companion of the Order of the Star of india (CSI)
 Stanley Ismay, Esq., Indian Civil Service
 David Thomas Roberts, Esq., Indian Civil Service
 James Wilson, Esq., Indian Civil Service
 Robert Burton Buckley, Esq., Chief Engineer and Secretary to the Government of Bengal in the Public Works Department
 Arthur Frederick Cox, Esq., Indian Civil Service
 Charles Gerwien Bayne, Esq., Indian Civil Service

Order of Saint Michael and Saint George

Knight Grand Cross of the Order of St Michael and St George (GCMG)
 Sir Giuseppe Carbone, KCMG, LLD, Chief Justice, President of the Court of Appeal, and Vice-President of the Council of Government of the Island of Malta
 Sir Henry Hamilton Johnston, KCB, lately His Majesty's Special Commissioner, Commander-in-Chief, and Consul-General for the Uganda Protectorate and the adjoining Territories

Knight Commander of the Order of St Michael and St George (KCMG) 
 Ernest Edward Blake, Esq., one of the Crown Agents for the Colonies
 Alfred Lewis Jones, Esq., President of the Liverpool Chamber of Commerce, in recognition of services to the West African colonies and to Jamaica
 Frederick Robert St John, Esq., on retirement of the post of His Majesty's Envoy Extraordinary and Minister Plenipotentiary at Berne
 Audley Charles Gosling, Esq., on retirement from the post of His Majesty's Envoy Extraordinary and Minister Plenipotentiary at Santiago

Companion of the Order of St Michael and St George (CMG)
 Commodore Alfred Leigh Winsloe, RN, CVO, in command of His Majesty's ship Ophir during the visit of the Duke and Duchess of Cornwall and York to the Colonies
 Charles Edward Ducat Pennycuick, Esq., on retirement as Treasurer of the Island of Ceylon
 William Robert Henderson, Esq., MD, Principal Medical Officer of the Gold Coast
 Robert Allman, Esq., Principal Medical Officer of Southern Nigeria
 Walter Egerton, Esq., First Magistrate, Singapore, in the Straits Settlements
 John Burchmore Harrison, Esq., MA, Government Analyst of the Colony of British Guiana
 Francois Hodoul, Esq., for many years Unofficial Member of the Legislative Council of the Seychelles Islands
 Henry Blythe Westrap Russell, Esq., in recognition of his services while employed with the Ashanti Field Force
 Albert Charles Wratislaw, Esq., His Majesty's Consul at Basrah
 Brevet Lieutenant-Colonel William Spottiswoode Sparkes, for services in Egypt
 Captain Robert Leonard Sunkersett Arthur (the Rifle Brigade), His Majesty's Consul at Dakar and Colonial Secretary designate of the Gold Coast. 
 Lieutenant-Colonel Edward Altham Altham, Deputy-Assistant Adjutant-General, Intelligence Division, War Office, for services to the Foreign Office
 Captain and Brevet Major Herbert Henry Austin, RE, DSO
 Captain and Brevet Major Richard George Tyndal Bright (Rifle Brigade), for services in connection with the recent Expedition to survey the frontier between Abyssinia and the Protectorates of the British East Africa and Uganda

Order of the Indian Empire

Knights Grand Commander of the Order of the Indian Empire (GCIE)
 General Sir Arthur Power Palmer, KCB, Commander-in-Chief in India
 Maharao Sir Kesri Singh Bahadur, of Sirohi, in Rajputana, KCSI

Knights Commander of the Order of the Indian Empire (KCIE) 
 Nawab Shahbaz Khan, Bugti, of Baluchistan
 James George Scott, Esq., CIE, Deputy Commissioner in Burma
 Raja Jang Bahadur Khan, of Nanpara, in the Bahraich District of Oudh, CIE

Companion of the Order of the Indian Empire (CIE)
 Thomas Conland, Esq., Barrister-at-Law, Member of the Council of the Lieutenant-Governor of the North-Western Provinces and Oudh for making Laws and Regulations
 Sidney Preston, Esq., Chief Engineer and Secretary to the Government of the Punjab in the Public Works Department, Irrigation Branch
 Murray Hammick, Esq., Indian Civil Service
 Alexander Pedler, Esq., FRS, Director of Public Instruction, Bengal
 Richard Amphlett Lamb, Esq., Indian Civil Service
 William Stevenson Meyer, Esq., Indian Civil Service
 Alexander Lauzun Pendock Tucker, Esq., Indian Civil Service
 Diwan Bahadur Kanchi Krishnaswami Rao, Diwan of the Travancore State
 William Leathem Harvey, Esq., Indian Civil Service
 Lieutenant-Colonel John Clibborn, Indian Staff Corps
 Lieutenant-Colonel George Wingate, Indian Staff Corps
 Lieutenant-Colonel George Hart Desmond Gimlette, MD, Indian Medical Service
 Louis S. Moss, Esq., Agent and Manager of the Madras Railway Company
 Arthur Henry Wallis, Esq., Calcutta
 Alexander Johnstone Dunlop, Esq., Senior Member, Board of Revenue, the Nizam's Government
 George Herbert Dacres Walker, Esq, Under Secretary to the Government of India in the Public Works Department, General Branch
 Major Alexander Fleetwood Pinhey, Indian Staff Corps
 Rai Bahadur Nanak Chand, Minister of the Indore State
 Spencer Harcourt Butler, Esq., Indian Civil Service
 Captain Frank Cooke Webb Were, Indian Staff Corps
 Honorary Major Thomas Henry Hill, lately Senior Assistant-Surgeon, Indian Subordinate Medical Department
 Rai Bahadur Radhika Prasanna Mukharji, lately Inspector of Schools in Bengal

Kaisar-i-Hind Medal
 Sardar Khan Bahadur Mir Abdul Ali, JP, Bombay
 Shankar Madhav Chitnavis, Esq., Deputy-Commissioner, Central Provinces
 Khan Bahadur Dhanjibhai Fakirji Commodore, CIE
 Major Herbert Edward Deane, R.A.M.C.
 Major Thomas Edward Dyson, MB, CM, Indian Medical Service
 Mrs. E. J. Firth, of Madras
 N. S. Glazebrook, Esq., JP, of Bombay
 Sydney Hutton Cooper Hutchinson, Esq., AMICE, Superintendent of Telegraphs
 Colonel Sir Samuel Swinton Jacob, KCIE, Indian Staff Corps
 Harrington Verney Lovett, Esq., Indian Civil Service
 Herbert Frederick Mayes, Esq., Barrister-at-Law, Indian Civil Service
 Lieutenant-Colonel James McCloghry, FRCS, Indian Medical Service
 William Florey Noyce, Esq., Extra-Assistant Commissioner and Assistant Secretary to the Financial Commissioner, Burma
 Rai Bahadur Kameleshwari Pershad Singh of Monghyr, Bengal
 Robert Barton Stewart, Esq., Indian Civil Service
 Captain Edmund Wilkinson, FRCS, Indian Medical Service

References

Birthday Honours
1901 awards
1901 in the United Kingdom